These are the official results of the  Men's Triple Jump event at the 1986 European Championships in Stuttgart, West Germany, held at Neckarstadion on 29 and 30 August 1986.

Medalists

Abbreviations
All results shown are in metres

Records

Results

Final
30 August

Qualification
29 August

Participation
According to an unofficial count, 23 athletes from 13 countries participated in the event.

 (1)
 (2)
 (1)
 (3)
 (2)
 (1)
 (1)
 (1)
 (1)
 (3)
 (3)
 (2)
 (2)

See also
 1983 Men's World Championships Triple Jump (Helsinki)
 1984 Men's Olympic Triple Jump (Los Angeles)
 1987 Men's World Championships Triple Jump (Rome)
 1988 Men's Olympic Triple Jump (Seoul)

References

 Results

Triple jump
Triple jump at the European Athletics Championships